The following is a list of accolades and honors conferred upon A. P. J. Abdul Kalam, the Indian aerospace scientist who served as the 11th President of India from 2002 to 2007.

Honorary Degrees
Distinguished Fellow  Institute of Directors, India, 1994
Honorary Fellow  National Academy of Medical Sciences, 1995
Honorary Doctorate of Science  University of Wolverhampton, UK, 2007
King Charles II Medal  UK, 2007
Honorary Doctor of Engineering  Nanyang Technological University, Singapore, 2008
International von Kármán Wings Award  California Institute of Technology, USA, 2009
Hoover Medal  American Society of Mechanical Engineers, USA, 2009
Doctor of Engineering  University of Waterloo, Canada, 2010
IEEE Honorary Membership  Institute of Electrical and Electronics Engineers, USA, 2011
Honorary Doctor of Laws  Simon Fraser University, Canada, 2012
Honorary Doctor of Science  University of Edinburgh, Scotland, 2014

Awards of Dr A.P.J Abdul Kalam 
1981: Padma Bhushan  Government of India 
1990: Padma Vibhushan  Government of India
1997: Bharat Ratna  Government of India
1997: Indira Gandhi Award for National Integration  Government of India
1998: Veer Savarkar  Award  Government of India 
2000: SASTRA Ramanujan Prize  Shanmugha Arts,Science,Technology & Research Academy, India
2013: Von Braun Award  National Space Society

Honours 

 United Nations declared his birthday as World Students' Day
 Government of Tamil Nadu announced that an award will be given in his name Dr. A. P. J. Abdul Kalam Award
 On 4 September 2015, Wheeler Island near the coast of Indian state Orissa has been renamed to honor the late Indian president, Dr. A.P.J. Abdul Kalam as A.P.J. Abdul Kalam Island.

 APJ Abdul Kalam with students A file picture of students of St. Aloysius college trying to greet APJ Abdul Kalam when he came to inaugurate the IT building of the college on March 28, 2003.

References

Kalam, Abdul
A. P. J. Abdul Kalam